() is a type of flour made from ground toasted barley or other toasted grains. It is used in Bolivian, Ecuadorian and Peruvian cuisine.

History
Spanish colonists brought the technique of toasting grain to enhance its nutritional value, then grinding the toasted grain into flour, from Central America to the Andean region. The Mesoamerican product, uses toasted corn, but in Ecuador the process was applied primarily to barley.

Production
Grain is toasted, then ground finely.

Uses

 is used in a variety of foods that are part of Andean cuisine. It is used to batter and season meat to be fried, such as pork rinds or shellfish including shrimp.  is sometimes also added to hot chocolate or cold juice, and has been used to flavor ice cream. It is incorporated into stroopwafels (a cookie which originated in the Netherlands) made in Peru and filled with other Andean ingredients such as passion fruit and chicha. Some indigenous peoples use  to prepare , a traditional meat.

Nutritional value
One hundred grams of  made from barley contains 344 calories (kcal), 8.6 grams protein, 0.7 g fat, 77.4 grams carbohydrates, 6.6 g fiber, 74 mg calcium, 320 mg phosphorus, 12.3 mg iron, 0.12 mg vitamin B1, 0.25 mg vitamin B2, 8.7 mg niacin, and 1.9 mg vitamin C. For máchica made from wheat, 100 grams contains 347 calories, 7.9 g protein, 1.2 g fat, 79.9 g carbohydrates, 4.1 g fiber, 67 mg calcium, 0.9 mg iron, and 2.7 mg vitamin C.

Other varieties

See also
 Barley flour
 Gofio, a similar product in the Canary Islands, brought to Latin America

References

Barley
Bolivian cuisine
Ecuadorian cuisine
Flour
Latin American cuisine
Maize products
Peruvian cuisine